Valu lui Traian (historical name: Hasancea) is a commune in Constanța County, Northern Dobruja, Romania.

The commune was established in 1897, under the name Hasancea. In 1925 it was renamed Valu lui Traian (Trajan's Wall), after the vallum located nearby. In 1967, the village of Valea Seacă (historical name: Omurcea) was merged into Valu lui Traian, now the commune's only village.

Nature reserve 
There is a nature reserve north-east of Valu lui Traian village, in the Medgidia Plateau. It is located on top of an archaeological site, remnants of a Roman defensive system, and houses several species of xerophilous plants and shrubs on its slopes.

Demographics
At the 2002 census, 81.5% of inhabitants were Romanians, 15% Tatars, 2.1% Roma and 1.2% Turks. 82% were Romanian Orthodox and 16.1% Muslim. At the 2011 census, Valu lui Traian had 9,815 Romanians (85.71%), 6  Hungarians (0.05%), 213 Roma  (1.86%), 3 Germans (0.03%), 191 Turks (1.67%), 1,189 Tatars (10.38%), 7 Lipovans (0.06%), 20 others (0.17%), 8 with undeclared ethnicity (0.07%).

References

Communes in Constanța County
Localities in Northern Dobruja